Trichopoda is a genus of tachinid flies, commonly known as the feather-legged flies or hairy-legged flies. They are small, brightly coloured flies that congregate on flowers, feeding on nectar. The halteres are covered with yellow scales and there is a fringe of flattened hairs on the hind legs. The larvae are parasitoids of true bugs in the order Hemiptera, including stink bugs in the family Pentatomidae and leaf-footed bugs and squash bugs in the family Coreidae. They are found in North and South America.

Species
Subgenus Galactomyia Townsend, 1908
Trichopoda bosqi (Blanchard, 1966)
Trichopoda christenseni (Blanchard, 1966)
Trichopoda giacomelli (Blanchard, 1966)
Trichopoda lanipes Fabricius, 1805
Trichopoda limbata (Blanchard, 1966)
Trichopoda nigrifrontalis (Blanchard, 1966)
Trichopoda pennipes Fabricius, 1781
Subgenus Trichopoda Berthold, 1827
Trichopoda ciliata (Fabricius), 1805
Trichopoda incognita (Blanchard, 1966)
Trichopoda indivisa Townsend, 1897
Trichopoda pilipes (Fabricius), 1805
Trichopoda plumipes (Fabricius), 1805
Trichopoda subdivisa Townsend, 1908

References

External links
 Photographs of Trichopoda pennipes

Phasiinae
Diptera of North America
Diptera of South America
Tachinidae genera
Taxa named by Arnold Adolph Berthold